Tihomir Nikolaev Trifonov (born 25 November 1986) is a Bulgarian former professional footballer who played as a defender. He had spells in Bulgaria, Moldova and Wales.

Career
His teammates call him "Hero" because of its similarity with Dimitar Dimitrov – Hero. Litex Lovech signed his first professional contract, but never recorded an official match for the first team. In 2006, along with youth adolescents he is disposed of Litex River (Montana) where the head coach at the time is Ferario Spasov. Trifonov played 23 games, the team from the relegation zone ends at the fifth place. Before the start of the 2006–07 season was then sold to the elite Lokomotiv (Mezdra) which is liked by the then sports director George Bachev. In 2009, Montana passed which played 80 matches in group A for three seasons. In the summer of 2012 with an option to continue his career in Poland, but after she failed to sign two years with the elite rookie Etar Veliko Tarnovo [2] Tsanko Tsvetanov coach a vote of confidence and even makes the team captain.

Trifonov started to play football by Etar Veliko Tarnovo, where Litex Lovech scouted him, and signed him for the youth-team. He made his debut in professional football, being part of the Dunav Rousse squad in the 2005–06 season in second division.

In June 2007 joined to Lokomotiv Mezdra and was promoted to the top division with the team. In season 2008–09, Trifonov earned 12 appearances playing in the A PFG.

On 24 July 2009 Montana signed Trifonov to a three-year deal. He made his competitive debut for Montana on 8 August 2009 against Sliven 2000 in the first round of the A PFG.

On 4 July 2012 Trifonov signed a two-year deal with Etar Veliko Tarnovo, which was his youth team. His first official match for Etar Veliko Tarnovo was on 12 August 2012 against Montana where Etar Veliko Tarnovo won by a score of 3:2. On 29 November 2012 Trifonov signed a two-year and a half deal with Chernomorets Burgas. His contract was terminated mutually by his request on 30 June 2013 due to heavy injures.

On 22 January 2017, Trifonov joined Moldovan club Zaria Bălți.

In June 2018, Trifonov joined Lokomotiv Gorna Oryahovitsa.

In June 2021, Trifonov moved to Wales and joined Cymru North side Penrhyncoch

References

External links

1986 births
Living people
People from Veliko Tarnovo
Bulgarian footballers
Bulgarian expatriate footballers
Bulgarian expatriate sportspeople in Moldova
Expatriate footballers in Moldova
First Professional Football League (Bulgaria) players
Second Professional Football League (Bulgaria) players
Moldovan Super Liga players
FC Dunav Ruse players
PFC Lokomotiv Mezdra players
FC Montana players
FC Etar 1924 Veliko Tarnovo players
PFC Chernomorets Burgas players
PFC Lokomotiv Plovdiv players
FC Haskovo players
Neftochimic Burgas players
CSF Bălți players
FC Lokomotiv Gorna Oryahovitsa players
Association football central defenders
Penrhyncoch F.C. players
Cymru North players
Sportspeople from Veliko Tarnovo Province